Origin Enterprises plc is a focused agri-services group providing specialist on-farm agronomy services and the supply of crop technologies and inputs. The group has leading market positions in Ireland, the United Kingdom, Poland, Romania and Ukraine. Origin is listed on the ESM market of Euronext Dublin.

History
Origin was established by the IAWS Group in 2006 to focus on the original agribusiness and food and nutrition businesses of IAWS: it was admitted to the IEX and AIM on 5 June 2007. In October 2013 it bought 60% of Agroscope, a Ukrainian business, for $17.6m. Then in September 2015 it completed the acquisition of Romania's Redoxim.  

In November 2015, it completed the acquisition of Kazgod group in Poland and in December 2015, it completed the acquisition of Comfert S.R.L. in Romania. In June 2018, it announced an agreement to expand its footprint within South America, buying a sharehold part of two Brazilian companies, by €50.3m.

Operations
Agri-services businesses include:

R&H Hall
Goulding
Agrii
AgSpace
Origin Fertilisers
PB Kent
Rigby Taylor
Agrii Polska (Poland)
Comfert (Romania)
Redoxim (Romania)
Agroscope (Ukraine)

References

External links
Origin Enterprises official website

Food companies of the Republic of Ireland
Food and drink companies based in Dublin (city)
Companies listed on Euronext Dublin
Irish companies established in 2006
Multinational companies headquartered in the Republic of Ireland
Agriculture companies established in 2006